António de Lima Fragoso (17 June 1897 – 13 October 1918) was a Portuguese composer and pianist.

Biography
Fragoso was born in Pocariça, Cantanhede.  According to the Biblioteca Municipal de Cantanhede, he was given his earliest music lessons by his uncle, Dr. António dos Santos Tovin, and continued after his move to Oporto under the supervision of another uncle, who was also Fragoso's godfather, Dr José d´Oliveira Lima. He studied piano with Professor Ernesto Maia.

At Lisbon Conservatoire of music, which he entered aged 17, he studied harmony and score-reading, and piano with Marcos Garin, Tomás Borba and Luís de Freitas Branco. He achieved very high marks in his final examination on 3 July 1918.

On 13 October 1918 influenza claimed his life. He died in his house in Pocariça, aged 21.

Producer Manuela Paraíso describes his musical style as "having notable influences of Chopin, Fauré and Debussy", yet also asserts that "his beautiful, melancholy music has an identity of its own".

Today, the Associação António Fragoso exists to commemorate his work, and promote recordings and performances of his music.

References

Information Database of Portuguese Composers (BDCP)

External links

Portuguese Music and Musicians blog
Information Database of Portuguese Composers (BDCP)
Associação António Fragoso

1897 births
1918 deaths
People from Cantanhede, Portugal
Portuguese composers
Portuguese male composers
20th-century composers
Deaths from the Spanish flu pandemic in Portugal
20th-century male musicians